Events from the year 1791 in the United States.

Incumbents

Federal Government 
 President: George Washington (no political party)
 Vice President: John Adams (F-Massachusetts)
 Chief Justice: John Jay (New York)
 Speaker of the House of Representatives: Frederick Muhlenberg (Pro-Admin.-Pennsylvania) (until March 4), Jonathan Trumbull, Jr. (Pro-Admin.-Connecticut) (starting October 24)
 Congress: 1st (until March 4), 2nd (starting March 4)

Events

 February 24 – First Bank of the United States chartered for 20 years, with headquarters in Philadelphia.
 March 4 – Vermont is admitted as the 14th U.S. state (see History of Vermont).
 March 5 – Thomas Chittenden is inaugurated as the first governor of Vermont. 
 March 9 – Pierre Charles L'Enfant arrives in Georgetown and begins designing the federal capital city.
 March 30 – District of Columbia is established.
 April 29–May 8 – The first American ships reach Japan, brigantine Lady Washington captained by John Kendrick of Boston, and the brig Grace.
 August 26 – John Fitch is granted a patent for the steamboat in the United States.
 September 5 – An ordinance is written barring the game of baseball within 80 yards of the Meeting House in Pittsfield, Massachusetts, the first known reference to the game of baseball in North America.
 September 9 – Washington, D.C. is officially named after the incumbent President.
 September 25 – Mission Santa Cruz is founded by Basque Franciscan Father Fermín Lasuén, becoming the 12th mission in the California mission chain.
 October 9 – Mission Nuestra Señora de la Soledad is founded by Father Fermin Lasuen, becoming the 13th mission in the California mission chain.
 October 25 – The State of the Union address.
 December 15 – Ratification by the states of the first ten amendments to the United States Constitution is completed, creating the United States Bill of Rights. Two additional amendments remain pending, and one of these is finally ratified in 1992, becoming the Twenty-seventh Amendment.

Ongoing
 Northwest Indian War (1785–1795)

Births
 February 4 – John McClean, United States Senator from Illinois from 1824 till 1825 and from 1829 till 1830. (died 1830)
 February 12 – Peter Cooper, industrialist, inventor, philanthropist, and candidate for President of the United States (died 1883)
 April 23 – James Buchanan, 15th President of the United States from 1857 till 1861. (died 1868)
 April 27 – Samuel Morse, American painter and inventor (died 1872)
 June 1 – John Nelson (lawyer), United States lawyer (died 1860)
 July 18 – Isaac D. Barnard, United States Senator from 1827 till 1831. (died 1834)
 October 24 – Joseph R. Underwood, United States Senator from Kentucky from 1847 till 1853. (died 1876) 
 November 27 – Truman Smith, United States Senator from Connecticut from 1849 till 1854. (died 1884)

Deaths
 April 24 – Benjamin Harrison V, signer of Declaration of Independence, father of President William Henry Harrison, great-grandfather of President Benjamin Harrison (born 1726)
 May 9 – Francis Hopkinson, signer of Declaration of Independence (born 1737)
John Roth Prussian clergyman (born 1726 in Prussia)

See also
Timeline of United States history (1790–1819)

Further reading
 Lists of Foreigners Who Arrived at Philadelphia, 1791-1792. The Pennsylvania Magazine of History and Biography, Vol. 24, No. 2 (1900), pp. 187–194.
 
 Journal of John Mair, 1791. The American Historical Review, Vol. 12, No. 1 (October, 1906), pp. 77–94.
 Journal of William Loughton Smith, 1790-1791. Proceedings of the Massachusetts Historical Society, Third Series, Vol. 51, (October, 1917 – June, 1918).
 Joseph W. Barnwell. Washington's Southern Tour, 1791, by Archibald Henderson. The South Carolina Historical and Genealogical Magazine, Vol. 26, No. 1 (January, 1925), pp. 59–64.
 Samuel C. Williams. The Southwest Territory to the Aid of the Northwest Territory, 1791. Indiana Magazine of History, Vol. 37, No. 2 (JUNE, 1941), pp. 152–157.
 J. Paul Selsam. France and Pennsylvania: an exchange of greetings in 1791. Pennsylvania History, Vol. 14, No. 1 (January 1947), pp. 13–22.
 Richard K. Murdoch. Documents Pertaining to the Georgia-Florida Frontier, 1791-1793. The Florida Historical Quarterly, Vol. 38, No. 4 (April, 1960), pp. 319–338.
 
 
 Silvio A. Bedini. Benjamin Banneker and the Survey of the District of Columbia, 1791. Records of the Columbia Historical Society, Washington, D.C., Vol. 69/70, The 47th separately bound book (1969/1970), pp. 7–30.
 Jack D. L. Holmes, J. Leitch Wright Jr. Luis Bertucat and William Augustus Bowles: West Florida Adversaries in 1791. The Florida Historical Quarterly, Vol. 49, No. 1 (July, 1970), pp. 49–62.
 
 
 Tim H. Blessing. The Lewistown riots, 1791-1793: a micro-analytic approach. Pennsylvania History, Vol. 71, No. 3 (Summer 2004), pp. 285–321

References

External links
 

 
1790s in the United States
United States
United States
Years of the 18th century in the United States